Rafael Landry Tanubrata (born in Garut, West Java, Indonesia on November 16, 1986) is an Indonesian singer-songwriter, dancer and actor. He is a member of the boy band SM*SH.

Filmography

Television drama

TV Shows 
 Inbox (2014)
 JKT48 Finding a Star (season 1, 2015)

Discography

Before joining SM*SH 
 Vocalist (2003) (before joining SM*SH)

Singles 
 Tiada Kata Berpisah (There is no word Split) (2015)

As SM*SH member

Albums 
 SM*SH (2011) as a member SM*SH
 Step Forward (2012) as a member SM*SH

Singles 
 I Heart You (2010)
 Senyum Semangat (2011)
 Ada Cinta (2011)
 Akhiri Saja (2011)
 Selalu Bersama (2011)
 Ahh (2011)
 Cinta Kau Dan Dia (2011)
 Gadisku (2011)
 Pahat Hati (2012)
 Rindu Ini (2013)
 Selalu Tentang Kamu (2013)

References

External links 
 Sm*sh: Boyband Asli Indonesia
 Official Smash Website
  SMSH Bangkitkan Semangat dengan Tiga Lagu Nasional
  Rafael "SM*SH" Suka Curhat Tentang Berat Badan Kepada Ibunya

1986 births
Living people
Indonesian Christians
Indonesian people of Chinese descent
Indonesian dance musicians
21st-century Indonesian male singers
Indonesian pop singers
Indonesian rhythm and blues singers
Indonesian Roman Catholics
Indonesian soul singers
Synth-pop singers
VJs (media personalities)